Twelve Foot Ninja are an Australian heavy metal band from Melbourne, Victoria. They released their debut album Silent Machine in 2012. The band consists of Kin (vocals), Russ (drums), Stevic (lead guitar), and Rohan (rhythm guitar). They won Best New Talent at the 2014 Revolver Golden Gods Awards (America's only hard rock music awards) as well as two listener-voted awards from SiriusXM's Liquid Metal the year before. The band broke a world record for the most amount crowdfunded for a music video. Their first headline tour of Europe in April 2017 sold out five of the seven UK shows. In mid 2022, the band announced an "indefinite hiatus". Although, they (with Nik Barker, departing  vocalist) are working on an acoustic album of Twelve Foot Ninja material. The release date is yet to be announced.

History

2008–2011: Early years and early EPs
The band formed in 2008 and released their debut EP New Dawn in 2008, resulted in the band earning a Triple J Unearthed number 1 with the track "Dark Passenger", various support slots, and an appearance at Sydney's Come Together Festival.

Their second EP, Smoke Bomb, was released in November 2010. Produced by the band’s guitarist Steve "Stevic" Mackay in his Melbourne home studio, the EP was mixed by local producer/engineer Hadyn Buxton (Trial Kennedy, Jonesez, Blueline Medic, Dukes of Windsor, Felix Riebl) and mastered by Howie Weinberg (Deftones, Nirvana, Jeff Buckley) at Masterdisk, New York City. Guest musicians on the release include Bär McKinnon (Mr. Bungle) on saxophone and Ollie McGill (Cat Empire) on keyboards.

2012–2015: Silent Machine 
Their debut studio album, Silent Machine, was released in November 2012. The album's first official single "Mother Sky" was released on 24 August and the video was premiered on Triple J's Home & Hosed blog. The second single "Coming for You" was released on 2 November 2012. Each song from the debut album came with a comic, created by Keith Draws (UK), inspired by the lyrics and based on the original fable of Twelve Foot Ninja (co-written by Steve "Stevic" Mackay). The story follows a sole ninja's mission to restore balance in a world headed toward a self-inflicted apocalypse  All the individual comics were later combined into a 72-page bound comic book.

In early 2013, Twelve Foot Ninja embarked on their first headline tour of Australia and sold out every capital city. The band successfully completed a crowdfunding campaign on Australian site Pozible in May 2013 for a music video "Ain't That a Bitch"  about a fantastic revenge story on an internet troll.

In October–November 2013, Twelve Foot Ninja toured Europe and North America for the first time. Their first show in London at the Camden Barfly sold out 3 weeks in advance and they also played Euroblast in Cologne, selling the most merchandise after the headliners Meshuggah. Their US/Canada tour in 2013 was opening for progressive metal band Periphery. In May 2014 Twelve Foot Ninja returned to North America for their first headline tour. They also played AEG festivals Rock on the Range, Carolina Rebellion, Welcome To Rockville, Rocklahoma. They were also invited to showcase at Michele Clark's revered radio conference in San Diego Sunset Sessions Rock.

In July 2014, the single "Coming for You" was serviced to US Active Rock radio and reached number 45 on the Active Rock chart. The video of "Coming for You" has reached over 4.1 million views on YouTube and their total channel views reached over 10 million. The band toured the US again from October to December 2014 in support of In This Moment.

2016–2019: Outlier 
In November 2015, Twelve Foot Ninja announced they were working on their second album for release late 2016. At that time they leaked an early track from the studio called "One Hand Killing". A few weeks later they released a video clip for the same track. The band also started a PledgeMusic campaign to help raise funds for the making of the new album and to start advance pre-orders. When talking to Loudwire vocalist Kin said "It has its roots in the ‘Silent Machine’ album but we’re kind of experimenting with a few different things. There’s more emphasis on songs and the actual songwriting as opposed to just riffs".

On 19 July 2016, Twelve Foot Ninja announced the title and release date of their second album, Outlier, released on 26 August 2016. Outlier debuted at #1 on the Australian 100% Independent Album chart, #2 on the ARIA Australian Artist Chart, and #6 on the overall ARIA chart. In the US, Outlier debuted at #15 on Billboard's Alternative Rock chart and #3 on Billboard's Heatseeker chart. The band were personally selected by Disturbed to be their support act on the 2016 Australian tour.

In April–May 2017, Twelve Foot Ninja toured Europe for the first time as a headliner. They sold out 5 of their 7 shows in the UK with strong numbers and some sold out shows in Holland, Germany, Switzerland, Czech Republic, Spain, and Italy. In July 2017, Twelve Foot Ninja announced their Monsoon Tour of Europe, India, and Nepal, book-ending the tour with headlining shows at Euroblast Festival in Cologne and Silence Festival in Kathmandu.

In 2019, long-serving bassist Damon McKinnon departed from the band.

2020–present: Vengeance, departure of Nik "Kin" Barker and indefinite hiatus
On 27 May 2021, the band released a music video for the song "Long Way Home". It was announced that the song would feature on an upcoming album slated to be released in 2021. The second single, "Start the Fire", was released on 9 July 2021. The third single "Over and Out" was released on 9 September 2021.

In October 2021, the album Vengeance was released and debuted at number 20 on the ARIA charts.

On 17 December 2021, Nik Barker announced that he would depart the band in late 2022 after a final planned Australian tour and after a new vocalist is in place.  The band have also announced an upcoming European tour for 2023 while in search for a new vocalist.

On 12 July 2022, the band announced they were going on indefinite hiatus and cancelling all their upcoming tours in 2023.

Members

Final lineup at time of hiatus
Nik "Kin Etik" Barker – lead vocals (2008–2022)
Steve "Stevic" MacKay – lead guitar (2008–2022) 
Shane "Russ" Russell – drums (2008–2022) 
Rohan "Ro" Hayes – rhythm guitar, backing vocals (2012–2022)
David de Vent – bass (2021–2022)

Former members
Damon McKinnon – bass (2008–2019)
Fred Narkel – rhythm guitar (2008–2012)

Discography

Studio albums

Extended plays

Awards and nominations

Golden Gods Awards
Best New Talent 2014
https://themusic.com.au/news/twelve-foot-ninja-named-best-new-talent-at-golden-gods-awards/BOsXFhkYGxo/28-04-14

AIR Awards
The Australian Independent Record Awards (commonly known informally as AIR Awards) is an annual awards night to recognise, promote and celebrate the success of Australia's Independent Music sector.

|-
| AIR Awards of 2017
| Outlier
| Best Independent Hard Rock, Heavey or Punk Album
| 
|-
| AIR Awards of 2022
| Vengeance
| Best Independent Heavy Album or EP
|

ARIA Music Awards
The ARIA Music Awards is an annual awards ceremony that recognises excellence, innovation, and achievement across all genres of Australian music.

|-
| ARIA Music Awards of 2016
| Outlier
| ARIA Award for Best Hard Rock or Heavy Metal Album
| 
|-

References

External links
 

Musical groups established in 2008
Victoria (Australia) musical groups
Australian progressive metal musical groups